Leiocephalus greenwayi, commonly known as the East Plana curlytail or Plana Cay curlytail lizard, is a species of lizard in the family of curly-tailed lizard (Leiocephalidae).

Etymology
The specific name, greenwayi, is in honor of American ornithologist James Cowan Greenway.

Geographic range
L. greenwayi is endemic to the Bahama Islands and has an extremely restricted range as it is only found on the Eastern island of the Plana Cays.

Conservation status
This species of curly-tailed lizard, L. greenwayi, is not listed by the IUCN or CITES as needing any special conservation, however, research is needed to determine its vulnerability due to its restricted range.

References

Further reading
Barbour T, Shreve B (1935). "Concerning some Bahamian Reptiles, with Notes on the Fauna". Proc. Boston Soc. Nat. Hist. 40: 347–365. (Leiocephalus greenwayi, new species, p. 358).
Schwartz A, Thomas R (1975). A Check-list of West Indian Amphibians and Reptiles. Carnegie Museum of Natural History Special Publication No. 1. Pittsburgh, Pennsylvania: Carnegie Museum of Natural History. 216 pp. (Leiocephalus greenwayi, p. 130).

External links
Bahamas National Trust
Ardastra Gardens, Zoo and Conservation Center

Greenwayi
Fauna of the Bahamas
Endemic fauna of the Bahamas
Reptiles described in 1935
Taxa named by Thomas Barbour
Taxa named by Benjamin Shreve